Dalibor Brázda (9 September 1921, Fryšták – 17 August 2005, Dietikon) was a Czech-Swiss music composer, arranger, and conductor.

References

External links
Stadtmusik Deitikon

1921 births
2005 deaths
Czech conductors (music)
Swiss conductors (music)
Male conductors (music)
Czech bandleaders
Swiss people of Czech descent
People from Fryšták
20th-century Czech male musicians
Czechoslovak emigrants to Switzerland